Piers Forster is a Professor of Physical Climate Change and Director of the Priestley International Centre for Climate at the University of Leeds. A physicist by training, his research focuses on quantifying the different human causes of climate change and the way the Earth responds. He is best known for his work on radiative forcing, climate sensitivity, contrails and Climate engineering. He has contributed heavily to the writing of Intergovernmental Panel on Climate Change (IPCC) reports, including acting as a Lead Author for the Fourth and Fifth Assessment Reports, and a Co-ordinating Lead Author for the Sixth Report. He also acted as a Lead Author of the IPCC 2018 Special Report on Global Warming of 1.5 °C.

Career 
Forster was educated at Imperial College, London where he gained a BSc in Physics in 1990.  He was subsequently awarded a PhD in Meteorology by the University of Reading in 1994.  After research posts at the Universities of Reading, Colorado and Melbourne he was appointed a Reader at the University of Leeds in 2005.  He has been Professor of Physical Climate Change at Leeds since 2008.

Forster was principal investigator of the Integrated Assessment of Geoengineering Proposals project. He has doubts as to whether geoengineering could be deployed effectively. Forster is also trustee of a UK rainforest-protection charity United Bank of Carbon. He has a number of UK government and industry roles including being a member of the UK Committee on Climate Change.

Awards
2011 Royal Society Wolfson Merit Award

2019 American Geophysical Union Fellow

References

Year of birth missing (living people)
British meteorologists
Living people
Alumni of Imperial College London
British climatologists
Academics of the University of Leeds
Intergovernmental Panel on Climate Change contributing authors
Intergovernmental Panel on Climate Change lead authors
Atmospheric scientists
Alumni of the University of Reading
Academics of the University of Reading
University of Colorado faculty
Academic staff of the University of Melbourne
Fellows of the American Geophysical Union